The 2014 Scotties Tournament of Hearts was held from February 1 to 9 at the Maurice Richard Arena in Montreal, Quebec. The defending champion Rachel Homan rink won their second straight title, with Homan becoming the youngest skip to ever win back-to-back championships. The team went undefeated throughout the tournament, with the team never even being forced to throw their final rock in any of their games.

Teams
Returning as defending champions were the Rachel Homan rink from Ottawa, representing Team Canada as a result of winning the 2013 Scotties Tournament of Hearts. None of the other qualified teams had won the Scotties. Perhaps the next most decorated team in the event was 2000 Canadian Junior champion, three-time Canada Cup champion and four-time Grand Slam event winner Stefanie Lawton and her Saskatoon rink. The only other team in the event with a Grand Slam event win was team Manitoba, skipped by Chelsea Carey from Winnipeg, who was playing in her first Scotties. Carey qualified out of a Manitoba provincial which excluded the Jennifer Jones rink who were preparing to represent Canada at the 2014 Winter Olympics. Returning to the Scotties was 11-time Newfoundland and Labrador champion Heather Strong and her rink from St. John's as well as 11-time Prince Edward Island champion Kim Dolan and her Charlottetown rink. Also returning was 2005 Canadian Junior champion Andrea Crawford, from Oromocto, who represented New Brunswick for the 7th time. 2011 Scotties bronze medalist and 1991 Canadian junior champion Heather Smith (formerly Smith-Dacey) and her team from Halifax represented Nova Scotia for the 5th time. Allison Ross and her rink from Dollard-Des-Ormeaux represented the host province of Quebec, and played in her fourth Scotties. Val Sweeting and her rink from Edmonton played in her second Scotties representing Alberta. Making their Scotties debut was the 2012 British Columbia junior champion Kesa Van Osch rink from Victoria. 2009 Canadian Mixed champion Alli Flaxey (formerly Nimik) represented her adopted province of Ontario. Her team hails from Listowel, and included second Lynn Kreviazuk, sister of Team Canada second Alison. Finally, representing the Yukon/Northwest Territories was the Sarah Koltun rink from Whitehorse. Koltun, an eight-time territorial junior champion, was fresh from representing the Yukon at the 2014 Canadian Junior Curling Championships.

The teams are listed as follows:
{| border=1 cellpadding=5 cellspacing=0
!bgcolor="#FF0000" width="250"| 
!bgcolor="#0000CD" width="250"| 
!bgcolor="#0099FF" width="250"| British Columbia
|-
|Ottawa CC, Ottawa
Skip: Rachel Homan
Third: Emma Miskew
Second: Alison Kreviazuk
Lead: Lisa Weagle
Alternate: Stephanie LeDrew
|Saville SC, Edmonton
Skip: Val Sweeting 
Third: Joanne Courtney
Second: Dana Ferguson
Lead: Rachelle Pidherny
Alternate: Renée Sonnenberg
|Victoria CC, Victoria
Skip: Kesa Van Osch
Third: Stephanie Baier
Second: Jessie Sanderson
Lead: Carley Sandwith
Alternate: Patti Knezevic
|- border=1 cellpadding=5 cellspacing=0
!bgcolor="#FFFF99" width="250"| Manitoba
!bgcolor="#FFD700" width="250"| New Brunswick
!bgcolor="#DC143C" width="250"| 
|-
|Fort Rouge CC, Winnipeg
Skip: Chelsea Carey
Third: Kristy McDonald
Second: Kristen Foster
Lead: Lindsay Titheridge
Alternate: Breanne Meakin
|Gage G&CC, Oromocto
Skip: Andrea Crawford
Third: Rebecca Atkinson
Second: Danielle Parsons
Lead: Jodie deSolla
Alternate: Jane Boyle
|Bally Haly G&CC, St. John's
Skip: Heather Strong
Third: Laura Strong
Second: Jessica Cunningham
Lead: Kathryn Cooper
Alternate: Noelle Thomas-Kennell
|- border=1 cellpadding=5 cellspacing=0
!bgcolor="#000080" width="250"| 
!bgcolor="#B22222" width="250"| 
!bgcolor="#006400" width="250"| 
|-
|Mayflower CC, Halifax
Skip: Heather Smith
Third: Jill Brothers
Second: Blisse Joyce
Lead: Teri Lake
Alternate: Stephanie McVicar
|Listowel CC, Listowel
Skip: Allison Flaxey
Third: Katie Cottrill
Second: Lynn Kreviazuk
Lead: Morgan Court
Alternate: Kim Tuck
|Charlottetown CC, Charlottetown
Skip: Kim Dolan
Third: Rebecca Jean MacDonald
Second: Sinead Dolan
Lead: Michala Robison
Alternate: Jackie Reid
|- border=1 cellpadding=5 cellspacing=0
!bgcolor="#00FFFF" width="250"| Quebec
!bgcolor="#32CD32" width="250"| Saskatchewan
!bgcolor="#A9A9A9" width="250"| Yukon/Northwest Territories
|-
|Glenmore CC, Dollard-des-Ormeaux
Skip: Allison Ross 
Third: Melissa Gannon 
Second: Brittany O'Rourke
Lead: Pamela Nugent 
Alternate: Lisa Davies|Nutana CC, SaskatoonSkip: Stefanie Lawton
Third: Sherry Anderson
Second: Sherri Singler
Lead: Marliese Kasner
Alternate: Dailene Sivertson|Whitehorse CC, WhitehorseSkip: Sarah Koltun
Third: Chelsea Duncan
Second: Patty Wallingham
Lead: Andrea Sinclair
Alternate: Lindsay Moldowan|}

Round robin standingsFinal Round Robin StandingsRound robin results
All draw times are listed in Eastern Standard Time (UTC−5).

Draw 1Saturday, February 1, 2:00 pmDraw 2Saturday, February 1, 7:00 pmDraw 3Sunday, February 2, 9:00 amDraw 4Sunday, February 2, 2:00 pmDraw 5Sunday, February 2, 7:00 pmDraw 6Monday, February 3, 2:00 pmDraw 7Monday, February 3, 7:30 pmDraw 8Tuesday, February 4, 9:00 amDraw 9Tuesday, February 4, 2:00 pmDraw 10Tuesday, February 4, 7:30 pmDraw 11Wednesday, February 5, 9:00 amDraw 12Wednesday, February 5, 2:00 pmDraw 13Wednesday, February 5, 7:00 pmDraw 14Thursday, February 6, 9:00 amDraw 15Thursday, February 6, 2:00 pmDraw 16Thursday, February 6, 7:30 pmDraw 17Friday, February 7, 9:00 amPlayoffs

1 vs. 2Friday, February 7, 7:30 pm3 vs. 4Saturday, February 8, 11:00 amSemifinalSaturday, February 8, 4:00 pmBronze medal gameSunday, February 9, 2:30 pmFinalSunday, February 9, 7:30 pmStatistics
Top 5 player percentagesAfter Draw 17Perfect games

Awards
The awards and all-star teams are as follows:

All-Star TeamsFirst Team Skip:  Rachel Homan, Canada
 Third:  Emma Miskew, Canada
 Second:  Alison Kreviazuk, Canada
 Lead:  Teri Lake, Nova ScotiaSecond Team''
 Skip:  Chelsea Carey, Manitoba
 Third:  Sherry Anderson, Saskatchewan
 Second:  Sherri Singler, Saskatchewan
 Lead:  Morgan Court, Ontario

Marj Mitchell Sportsmanship Award
  Sherry Anderson, Saskatchewan

Joan Mead Builder Award
 Linda Moore, colour commentator for TSN

Notes

References

External links

 
Scotties Tournament of Hearts
Scotties Tournament of Hearts
Curling competitions in Montreal
Scotties Tournament of Hearts
Scotties Tournament of Hearts
Scotties Tournament of Hearts
2010s in Montreal